The Oman bullhead shark, Heterodontus omanensis, is a bullhead shark of the family Heterodontidae found in the tropical western Indian Ocean around central Oman, from the surface to a depth of  on the continental shelf. This shark was described in 2005, making it one of the most recently described of its genus. The Oman bullhead shark likely is accidentally caught as bycatch, putting the species at risk.

References

 

Heterodontidae
Fish of the Indian Ocean
Fish described in 2005